The California state elections was held on Election Day, November 6, 2012. On the ballot were eleven propositions, various parties' nominees for the United States presidency, the Class I Senator to the United States Senate, all of California's seats to the House of Representatives, all of the seats of the State Assembly, and all odd-numbered seats of the State Senate.

This was the first general election with California's newly implemented nonpartisan blanket primary in effect, pursuant to Proposition 14, which passed with 53% voter approval in June 2010. Additionally, in November 2010, voters approved Proposition 20, which authorized a California Citizens Redistricting Commission to re-draw congressional district lines, in addition to its current job of drawing state senate district lines and state assembly district lines, taking away that job from the California state legislature. This was the first general election whose winners represent districts drawn by the Citizens Redistricting Commission.

After the election, California's congressional delegation gained four new Democrats, including the first gay Asian-American elected to Congress. Dianne Feinstein won her re-election bid for the U.S. Senate, and the Democrats gained a 2/3 supermajority in both of the state's legislative chambers. California voters also voted to re-elect incumbent President Barack Obama, giving him the state's fifty-five electoral votes. Among the propositions on the ballot, voters chose to increases taxes in order to fund education and other state programs, voted to keep the death penalty and the power of labor unions to use payroll deduction to fund political campaigns, and opted to reform the state's three-strikes law.

Presidential

Congressional

State

Propositions
11 propositions have been qualified for the ballot.

Proposition 30

This is an initiative constitutional amendment that would increase income tax on incomes over $250,000 for seven years and raise the statewide sales tax by 0.25% for four years, and allocates the additional incomes to education, as well as certain state services transferred from the state to local governments. If this measure and Proposition 38 both pass, then the measure with more "Yes" votes will take effect.

Proposition 31
This is an initiative constitutional amendment that would make several changes to the state budget process. It would change California's budget from an annual budget to a biennial budget, require the legislature to show how bills that increase state spending over $25 million would be offset, give the governor power to reduce spending if there is no budget for more than 45 days, require performance reviews of state and local programs, and allow local governments more power over how they administer programs funded by state taxes. It also requires bills to be published at least three days before they are voted on.

Proposition 32

Proposition 32 is an initiative statute. It would prohibit unions from using payroll-deducted funds for political purposes (the same restriction applying to payroll deductions, if any, by corporations and government contractors). In addition, it would permit voluntary employee contributions to an employee-sponsored committee or union with yearly written authorization, ban contributions to candidates and candidate-controlled committees by corporations and labor unions, and ban contractors who receive government contracts (including public-sector labor unions with collective bargaining agreements) from donating to office holders involved in awarding the contract or committees controlled by said officers.

Proposition 33
Similar to the failed Proposition 17 on the June, 2010 ballot. This is an initiative statute that would allow auto insurance companies to charge based on continuity (length) of the buyer's insurance coverage.

Proposition 34

Proposition 34 is an initiative statute that would end the death penalty in California.

The proposition was eventually defeated with 53% of the vote against it, despite the fact that supporters had spent 6 times more money in the campaign than opponents.

Proposition 35

This is an initiative statute that would expand the definition of human trafficking and increase the penalties for participating in the activity. It would also require convicted human traffickers to register as sex offenders, protect victims during court proceedings and require "human trafficking training" for police officers. In addition, the statute would require registered sex offenders to declare their "Internet identifiers" to the general public. Proposition 35 passed with 81% of the vote.

The ACLU and Electronic Frontier Foundation challenged Proposition 35's internet disclosure requirements as an unconstitutional violation of the First Amendment. In January 2013, U.S. District Judge Thelton Henderson found the challengers were likely to succeed and issued a preliminary injunction blocking enforcement of Proposition 35.  U.S. Ninth Circuit Court of Appeals Judge Jay Bybee affirmed the order blocking Proposition 35, finding the Proposition was unconstitutional even under intermediate scrutiny.  California Attorney General Kamala Harris declined to appeal and has announced she will not enforce Proposition 35 until it is rewritten so as to be constitutional.

Proposition 36

This is an initiative statute that would modify California's three-strikes law to reduce life sentences for felons if the third offense was non-serious and non-violent.

Proposition 37

California Proposition 37 is an initiated state statute that would require labeling of genetically engineered food, with some exceptions. It would also disallow the practice of labeling genetically engineered food with the word "natural".

Proposition 38

This is an initiative statute that would raise income taxes on all incomes over $7,316 for a period of twelve years, directing the revenues to education and state debt payments for the first four years, and then to education for the last eight years. If both this measure and Proposition 30 pass, then the measure with more "Yes" votes would take effect.

Proposition 39

Proposition 39 is an initiative statute that would change the way California businesses determine their state tax liabilities, and earmark up to $550 million of the anticipated additional revenue to alternative energy projects.

Proposition 40
This is a veto referendum to nullify the California Citizens Redistricting Commission's district maps for the California State Senate.

Postponed

Water bond (Proposition 18)
This is a legislatively referred statute that would authorize an $11.1 billion bond to upgrade California's water system. On August 9, 2010, the California Legislature postponed the vote on the proposition until 2012. This measure was again delayed to the November 2014 general election.

References

External links 
California Elections and Voter Information from the California Secretary of State
California at Ballotpedia
California judicial elections, 2012 at Judgepedia
California 2012 campaign finance data from OpenSecrets
California Congressional Races in 2012 campaign finance data from OpenSecrets
Outside spending at the Sunlight Foundation
Elections 2012 at the Los Angeles Times
Elections 2012 at the San Francisco Chronicle
Elections 2012 at the San Jose Mercury News
League of Women Voters of California Education Fund (nonpartisan, unbiased)
2012 California Election
SmartVoter.org 2012 California Election
Easy Voter Guide PDF 2012 California Election

 November
California 11